Major General Lionel Hugh Knightley Finch  (5 July 1888 – 23 October 1982) was a senior British Army officer.

Military career
After being educated at Cheltenham College, Finch was commissioned into the 3rd Battalion, the Queen's (Royal West Surrey) Regiment on 1 July 1908. He served in the 2nd Battalion the Cheshire Regiment in the First World War and his capture and subsequent detention as a prisoner of war was recognised by his appointment as an Officer of the Order of the British Empire. He was appointed a companion of the Distinguished Service Order (DSO) in the 1917 New Year Honours In September 1917 he was awarded a bar to his DSO,}} and later earned a second bar, with the second bar's citation reading:

He went on to command the 13th (Service) Battalion of the Cheshire Regiment in the later stages of the war.

After attending the Staff College, Camberley, from 1924 to 1925. Finch became commanding officer of 1st Battalion the Lancashire Fusiliers in 1934. He went on to be Assistant Adjutant-General at the War Office in 1936, Deputy Director of Recruiting and Organisation at the War Office in 1939 and Deputy Adjutant-General at the War Office in 1940. After that he became General Officer Commanding 18th Infantry Division in June 1940 before retiring in July 1940.

Finch was appointed a Companion of the Order of the Bath on 1 July 1941. He retired to Sussex, where he died on 23 October 1982, at the age of 94.

References

External links
Generals of World War II

Bibliography

1888 births
1982 deaths
Companions of the Order of the Bath
Companions of the Distinguished Service Order
Officers of the Order of the British Empire
Cheshire Regiment officers
Lancashire Fusiliers officers
British Army generals of World War II
People from Murree
British Army personnel of World War I
British World War I prisoners of war
Queen's Royal Regiment officers
People educated at Cheltenham College
War Office personnel in World War II
Graduates of the Staff College, Camberley
British Army major generals
Military personnel of British India